Acanthogalathea is an extinct genus of squat lobsters in the family Galatheidae. It was extant during the Eocene and Oligocene. It contains six species:

 Acanthogalathea broglioi Beschin et al., 2016
 Acanthogalathea devecchii Beschin et al., 2016
 Acanthogalathea feldmanni De Angeli and Garassino, 2002
 Acanthogalathea parva Müller & Collins, 1991
 Acanthogalathea paucispinosa Beschin et al., 2016
 Acanthogalathea squamosa Beschin et al., 2007

References

Squat lobsters
Fossil taxa described in 1991